Petrophora chlorosata, the brown silver-line, is a moth of the family Geometridae. The species was first described by Giovanni Antonio Scopoli in his 1763 Entomologia Carniolica. It is found in the Palearctic extending from Ireland and Britain to Asia Minor, northern Iran, the Altai mountains, Amdo, south eastern Siberia, and Japan.

The wingspan is 31–37 mm. The length of the forewings is 15–18 mm. Quite distinct from all other Palearctic species, the forewing light brown, the lines finely whitish, proximally dark shaded, subterminal line rather straight, sometimes indistinct. The egg has an elliptical shape and is initially light yellow, later orange. It is covered with 24 to 25 longitudinal ribs. The microphyll rosette is nine to ten-leaf. The caterpillars have a brownish or greenish colour. They show fine dark longitudinal lines and a wide whitish or yellowish side stripe.

The moth flies from the end of April to the end of June.

The caterpillars feed on bracken.

Notes
The flight season refers to Belgium and the Netherlands. This may vary in other parts of the range.

References

External links

Fauna Europaea
BioLib.cz
Lepiforum e.V.
De Vlinderstichting 

Geometridae
Moths described in 1763
Moths of Asia
Moths of Europe
Moths of Japan
Taxa named by Giovanni Antonio Scopoli